Briareidae is a family of corals, a member of the phylum Cnidaria.

Genera
Genera in this family include:
 Briareum Blainville, 1834
 Lignopsis Perez & Zamponi, 2000
 Pseudosuberia Kükenthal, 1919

References

 
Scleraxonia
Cnidarian families